Der royter shtern ('Red Star') was a Yiddish-language communist newspaper published in Argentina. The first issue of Der royte shtern was published at the time of the sixth anniversary of the October Revolution. The newspaper was the weekly organ of the Jewish Section (Idsektie) of the Communist Party of Argentina. Der royte shtern played an important role in the Yiddish communist press in the country, and around it various cultural and thematic publications were issued. As of 1925, Der royter shtern had 2,000 subscribers. As of 1927, the weekly edition stood at 3,500 copies (which can be compared with the figure for the Spanish-language organ of the party, La Internacional, at 6,000 and more than the Italian-language organ Ordine Nuovo).

The newspaper continued to be published until 1934. Der royter shern was replaced by Soviet, but only one issue of the new publication was published.

References

Ashkenazi Jewish culture in Argentina
Communism in Argentina
European-Argentine culture in Buenos Aires
Jewish Argentine history
Jews and Judaism in Buenos Aires
Weekly newspapers published in Argentina
Newspapers established in 1923
Publications disestablished in 1934
Yiddish communist newspapers
Mass media in Buenos Aires
Yiddish culture in South America
1923 establishments in Argentina
1934 disestablishments in Argentina